Sinthop Kaewphichit is a Thai politician who served as a MP for Nakhon Pathom province in the 25th House of Representatives and former military officer in Royal Thai Army (RTA). He is familiarly known as "Se Kaew" (เสธ.แก้ว).

Biography and political career
Sinthop (nickname: Kaew) was born at Mueang Nakhon Pathom District, Nakhon Pathom Province in politician family. His father Sunthorn Kaewphichit is a veteran and influential local politician of Nakhon Pathom, especially in the downtown Nakhon Pathom area. His older brother Somphat Kaewphichit was a MP for Nakhon Pathom province and was a former executive committee of the Chart Thai Party.

He graduated from Armed Forces Academies Preparatory School (AFAPS; class 32), and Chulachomklao Royal Military Academy (CRMA; class 43), he also holds a master's degree in engineering management from The George Washington University and a PhD in computational sciences and informatics from George Mason University.

After graduating with a bachelor's degree from CRMA, he was enlisted in the military. The last position is the Chief of Staff of the Commander Under the Office of the Secretary of the Army and received the highest rank of lieutenant colonel (LT COL).

He entered politics for the first time in the 2011 general election, when he was elected as a constituency MP in Nakhon Pathom constituency one (most of downtown Nakhon Pathom), replacing his brother Somphat who had been stripped of political rights and died in the meantime. He was elected as a MP under the Chartthaipattana Party.

In the 2019 general election, Sinthop moved to the Democrat Party and was elected again by narrowly defeating the candidate from the Future Forward Party. The Election Commission has implemented a new vote count, but he was still a winner.

After the election, he was appointed deputy secretary-general of the Democrat Party.

Notes

External links
 

Living people
1971 births
Sinthop Kaewphichit
Sinthop Kaewphichit
Sinthop Kaewphichit
Sinthop Kaewphichit
Sinthop Kaewphichit
George Washington University alumni
George Mason University alumni
Sinthop Kaewphichit
Sinthop Kaewphichit
Sinthop Kaewphichit